Kaan Berberoğlu (born 7 September 1977) is a Turkish swimmer. He competed in the men's 50 metre freestyle event at the 1996 Summer Olympics.

References

1977 births
Living people
Turkish male freestyle swimmers
Olympic swimmers of Turkey
Swimmers at the 1996 Summer Olympics
Sportspeople from İzmir
20th-century Turkish people